Gaali Maathu is a 1981 Indian Kannada-language drama film, directed and produced by the Dorai–Bhagavan duo. It is based on the novel of the same name by Ta. Ra. Su. The film stars Jai Jagadish, Lakshmi, Hema Choudhary and Kokila Mohan.

Cast 
 Lakshmi
 Hema Choudhary
 Jai Jagadish
 Mohan
 K. S. Ashwath
 Leelavathi
 Uma Shivakumar
 Sampath

Production 
Anant Nag was initially chosen for the lead role; he was later replaced by Jai Jagadish, Sundar Raj was also replaced by Charan Raj after the former asked for more remuneration.

Soundtrack 
The music of the film was composed by Rajan–Nagendra, with lyrics by Chi. Udaya Shankar. All the songs composed for the film were received extremely well.

References

External links 

 Gaali Maathu music

1981 films
1980s Kannada-language films
Films scored by Rajan–Nagendra
Films based on Indian novels
Films directed by Dorai–Bhagavan